Spice Run Wilderness (SRW) is a U.S. Wilderness area within the Monongahela National Forest of West Virginia in the United States. The remote area has no passenger car access.

Access
Users of SRW must enter it via the Greenbrier River (easily fordable at low-normal flows upstream of Spice Run), or by hiking in from the adjacent Calvin Price State Forest, or by driving a high-clearance vehicle to the southeastern corner of the Wilderness along Greenbrier County Route 16.

History 
Spice Run was named after a native shrub, Lindera benzoin — known as "spicebush" or "spicewood". The Spice Run Lumber Company created a logging boom town that harvested stands of timber to float down the Greenbrier River for the sawmills.  So great were these log runs, that the waterways were choked.

In 2009, Spice Run was designated a Wilderness along with several other areas of Monongahela National Forest.

Ecology 
Aside from Spice Run, the Davy Run and Kincaid Run watersheds are within the Spice Run Wilderness.  All three are native brook trout tributaries to the Greenbrier River.  Besides fishing, camping, hiking, botany and bird watching are popular activities.  There are at least 230 species of birds to watch.  Nine animals are on the Federal list for endangered species or threatened species such as the northern flying squirrel.

Across the Greenbrier River rests the Greenbrier River Trail, maintained by the West Virginia Division of Natural Resources along the former Chesapeake and Ohio Railway Greenbrier Subdivision.  This portion still shows traces of the old lumber-mill on the banks where the flow of logs was controlled.  Of the original community of Spice Run, only one house remains standing.

See also
List of U.S. Wilderness Areas
Wilderness Act
Greenbrier River Watershed Association

References

External links
 U.S. Forest Service: Spice Run Wilderness

Protected areas of Greenbrier County, West Virginia
IUCN Category Ib
Protected areas of Pocahontas County, West Virginia
Wilderness areas of West Virginia
Monongahela National Forest